Sisley Choi (born 6 February 1991) is a Hong Kong actress contracted to TVB.

Early life and career
Born Choi Sze-pui, she was born in Hong Kong and her ancestry can be traced back to Zhongshan, Guangdong. Her father was a police officer, which is the reason why Choi has stated her childhood education was quite strict. However, on television, Choi recalled her father's strict discipline was correct so that she can become a good person.

Choi attended Po Primary School and St. Paul Middle School and went abroad to study in Oamaru, New Zealand when she was thirteen.  She boarded at Waitaki Girls’ High School from 2005 to 2009. The experience encouraged her to continue her adventures abroad; she later went to Germany and spent three years as an au pair and to study ethnology and became fluent with the German language. 

In 2013, Choi withdrew from her studies and went back to Hong Kong to participate in the Miss Hong Kong pageant and won the first runner-up in the pageant. She made her acting debut in the 2014 drama Overachievers and took on her first female leading role in the 2015 drama Young Charioteers.

Choi won the Most Popular Female Character award at the 2017 TVB Anniversary Awards with her role in the legal drama Legal Mavericks. With the same role in the sequel Legal Mavericks 2020, she won the Best Actress award at the 2020 TVB Anniversary Awards, becoming the first post-90s TVB actress and the second youngest one after Ada Choi in 1998, to won the title.

Friendship 
In 2020, Choi along with Winki Lai, Jeannie Chan, Stephanie Ho, Anjaylia Chan and Cheronna Ng, formed the friendship group "SÏXTERS". She is also good friends with Grace Wong, Roxanne Tong and Vivien Yeo.

Filmography

Television dramas (TVB)

Television dramas (Shaw Brothers Studio)

Film

Awards and nominations

TVB Anniversary Awards

|-
| 2015
|  Young Charioteers
| rowspan="3"|Best Actress
| 
|-
| 2016
|  Speed of Life
| 
|-
|rowspan="2"|2017
|rowspan="2"|Legal Mavericks
| 
|-
|Most Popular Female Character
|
|-
|rowspan="2"|2018
|rowspan="2"|The Learning Curve of a Warlord
|Best Actress
| 
|-
|Most Popular Female Character
|
|-
|rowspan="2"|2019
|rowspan="2"|The Defected
|Best Actress
| 
|-
|Most Popular Female Character
|
|-
|rowspan="3"|2020
|Legal Mavericks 2020
|Best Actress
| 
|-
|rowspan="2"|Line Waker: Bull Fight
|Most Popular Female Character
| (Top 5)
|-
|Most Popular On-Screen Partnership (with Owen Cheung)
|
|-
|rowspan="7"|2022
|ICAC Investigators 2022
| rowspan="2"|Best Actress
| 
|-
|Forensic Heroes V
| 
|-
|ICAC Investigators 2022
|rowspan="2"|Most Popular Female Character
| 
|-
|Forensic Heroes V
| 
|-
|ICAC Investigators 2022
|rowspan="2"|Favourite TVB Actress in Malaysia
| 
|-
|rowspan="2"|Forensic Heroes V
| 
|-
|Most Popular On-screen Partnership (with Benjamin Yuen)
| 
|}

TVB Star Awards Malaysia

|-
| rowspan="3" style="text-align:center;"| 2015
| rowspan="2"| Young Charioteers
| Top 16 Favourite TVB Drama Characters
| 
|-
| rowspan="2"| Favourite TVB Most Improved Female Artiste
| 
|-
| Officer Geomancer
| 
|-
| rowspan="3" style="text-align:center;"| 2016
| Fashion War
| Favourite TVB Actress
| 
|-
|Presumed Accidents
| Top 15 Favourite TVB Drama Characters
| 
|-
| — 
|Online Most Beloved Star Award 2016
|
|-
| rowspan="3" style="text-align:center;"| 2017
| rowspan="3"|Legal Mavericks 
| Favourite TVB Actress
| 
|-
| Top 17 Favourite TVB Drama Characters
| 
|-
| Favourite TVB On-Screen Couple (with Vincent Wong, Tracy Chu)
| 
|}

StarHub TVB Awards

|-
| rowspan="2" style="text-align:center;"| 2016
| rowspan="2"| Fashion War
| My Favourite TVB Actress
| 
|-
| My Favourite TVB Female TV Characters
| 
|-
| rowspan="2" style="text-align:center;"| 2017
| rowspan="2"| Legal Mavericks 
| My Favourite TVB Actress
| 
|-
| My Favourite TVB Female TV Characters
| 
|-
|}

Hong Kong Film Award

|-
|2016 
| Keeper of Darkness 
|Best New Performer
|
|}

People’s Choice Television Awards

|-
|2017
| Legal Mavericks 
|People’s Choice Most Improved Female Artiste
| (Ranked 3rd)
|}

References

External links
  
 
 
 Miss HK profile

1991 births
Living people
Hong Kong television actresses
TVB actors
Hong Kong beauty pageant winners
21st-century Hong Kong actresses